The 1974–75 Los Angeles Kings season was the Kings' eighth season in the National Hockey League.

Offseason
Defenseman Barry Long (3G, 19Ast, plus/minus = +25) jumped to the Edmonton Oilers of the WHA.

Regular season

The Kings were coming off their first playoff appearance in 5 years and the season before finished with a .500 record and scored more goals than they allowed for the first time in club history. Still, they were placed in a division with the powerful Montreal Canadiens in the 1974–75 realignment and hockey experts joked that Montreal would clinch 1st place by Christmas. But the Kings started fast, losing only twice in their first 26 games. The Canadiens finally overtook them and clinched first place with only 3 games to play. In addition, the Kings had allowed the fewest goals in the most of the season (which would have earned their goaltender tandem of Rogie Vachon and Gary Edwards the Vezina Trophy under 1975 rules). But they faltered just enough at the end and the Philadelphia Flyers earned that honor by a mere 4 goals.

Playoffs
With the 4th best record in the league, the Kings were hopeful of a deep playoff run. But because they finished 2nd in the division, they had to play in the dangerous 2 out of 3 mini series. Their opponent was the Toronto Maple Leafs, who were under .500 on the season, finishing 27 points behind the Kings. But a hot goalie can carry a team and Toronto's Gord McRae got hot at the wrong time for the Kings. Toronto scored a late goal in game 1 but the Kings won in overtime, 3–2. Toronto won game 2 in overtime by the same 3–2 score, and won game 3 in L.A. 2–1. Three of the four higher seeded teams lost in the mini series.

Final standings

Schedule and results

Playoffs
Maple Leafs 2 at Kings 3 (OT)
Kings 2 at Maple Leafs 3 (OT)
Maple Leafs 2 at Kings 1

Player statistics

Awards and records
Jack Adams Award – Bob Pulford, Coach

All-NHL 2nd team – Rogie Vachon, Goalie

Transactions
The Kings were involved in the following transactions during the 1974–75 season.

Trades

Free agent signings

Free agents lost

Expansion draft

Draft picks
Los Angeles's draft picks at the 1974 NHL amateur draft held in Montreal, Quebec.

Farm teams

See also
1974–75 NHL season

References

External links

Los Angeles Kings seasons
Los Angeles Kings
Los Angeles Kings
Los
Los